Annie Ruth Graham (November 7, 1916 – August 14, 1968) was a U.S. Army officer who was the highest-ranked American servicewoman to die during the Vietnam War.

Lieutenant Colonel Graham was the chief nurse at the 91st Evacuation Hospital in Tuy Hòa.  In August 1968, she suffered a stroke and was evacuated to Japan where she died four days later. She had been a veteran of both World War II and the Korean War.  Graham was one of eight American servicewomen who died during the Vietnam War.  She was buried at Arlington National Cemetery. Her name is on Panel 48W, Line 12 of the Vietnam Veterans Memorial Wall.

References

External links
 

1916 births
1968 deaths
American female military personnel of the Vietnam War
United States Army Medical Corps officers
Female wartime nurses
Burials at Arlington National Cemetery
Neurological disease deaths in Japan
American military personnel killed in the Vietnam War
Female United States Army officers
United States Army personnel of World War II
United States Army personnel of the Korean War
United States Army personnel of the Vietnam War
20th-century American women